Between 1960 and 1974 the England cricket team represented England, Scotland and Wales in Test cricket. During that time England played 147 Test matches, resulting in 45 victories, 77 draws and 25 defeats. Their win to loss ratio of 1.80 was the best in Test cricket during this period. In the English summer of 1965, England played their last Test series against South Africa for almost 30 years, due to the sporting boycott of South Africa during the apartheid era. A 1968–69 series between the pair in South Africa was cancelled due to the D'Oliveira affair, a controversy over whether or not the England selectors would pick Basil D'Oliveira, a mixed-race player of South African origin. A later tour of England in 1970 was called off after pressure from James Callaghan, the British Home Secretary.

England faced Australia most frequently during this period—playing 39 matches against them—followed by the West Indies. England won more matches than they lost against India, New Zealand, Pakistan and South Africa, but against Australia they won eight and lost ten Ashes matches, while against the West Indies they won seven and lost nine. England won 13 matches by an innings, which included their second largest victory ever, when they won by an innings and 285 runs against India in 1974. Their largest victory by runs alone during this period was in the 1970–71 Ashes series against Australia, when they won by 299 runs, while they won by ten wickets on three occasions. Conversely, England lost by an innings on four occasions, and their 1973 loss to the West Indies by an innings and 226 runs remains their second largest defeat in Test history.

Key

Matches

Summary

Notes

References

Test
England in international cricket
England Test